The Irish Sailing Association, also known as Irish Sailing, is the national governing body for sailing, powerboating and windsurfing in Ireland.

Mission
The association's aim is to develop, support and promote sailing in Ireland, for all ages.

Strategic areas

Clubs and membership
Irish Sailing accepts membership both from sailing clubs and individuals across Ireland.

Training
Irish Sailing co-ordinates the training courses across Ireland in the following areas:
 Dinghy;
 Keelboat;
 Catamaran;
 Sailing Yacht;
 Motor Yacht;
 Powerboat;
 PWC;
 Inland Waterways;
 Windsurfing;
 Navigation;
 Emergency Care;
 Offshore Safety;
 Instructor;

Sailing and Yachting
The promotion of sailing and yachting in non-competitive environments.

Racing
Irish Sailing administers sail and yacht racing across Ireland, including the following:
 ECHO & IRC handicaps;
 Sail Numbers;
 Race Officials and training;
 Rules;
 Classes;
 Match Racing;
 Team Racing;
 Powerboat Racing.

It also looks after Irish involvement in International racing.

Famous sailors
See :Category:Irish sailors

Olympic sailing
See :Category:Olympic sailors of Ireland

History of Irish Olympic Sailing

1948 – LONDON (Royal Torbay Yacht Club, Torquay).
Firefly (single handed): Jimmy Mooney.

Swallow: Alf Delany, Hugh Allen.

Reserve: D. St. J. 'Jem' Sullivan.

Management: William 'Billy' Mooney, Errol McNally.

1952 – HELSINKI

Finn: Alf Delany

1956 – MELBOURNE

Finn: J. Somers Payne.

1960 – ROME

Flying Dutchman: Johnny Hooper, Peter Gray.

Dragon: Jimmy Mooney, David Ryder, Robin Benson.

Finn Class: J. Somers Payne.

Reserve: Neil Hegarty.

Management: Clayton Love Jnr, Alf Delany.

Boatman: Jimmy Miller.

1964 – TOKIO

Dragon: Eddie Kelliher, Harry Maguire, Ian 'Rob' d'Alton.

Finn: Johnny Hooper

Manager: Leo Flanagan

1968 – MEXICO CITY – Sailing in Acapulco
No competitors

1972 – MUNICH – Sailing in Kiel

Tempest: David Wilkins, Sean Whitaker.

Dragon: Robin Hennessy, Harry Byrne, Owen Delany.

Finn: Kevin McLaverty.

Flying Dutchman: Harold Cudmore, Richard O'Shea.

Reserves: Curly Morris (who sailed most races in the Dragon), Joe McMenamin.

Management: Peter Gray, Ken Ryan, Kare Brevik (weather).

1976 – MONTREAL – Sailing in Kingston.

470: Robert Dix, Peter Dix

Flying Dutchman: Barry O'Neill, Jamie Wilkinson.

Tempest: David Wilkins, Derek Jago.

Management: Ken Ryan, Jock Smith.

1980 – MOSCOW – Sailing in Tallinn.
SILVER MEDAL
Flying Dutchman: David Wilkins, Jamie Wilkinson.

Management: Michael Maguire, Tom Clancy

1984 – LOS ANGELES

Finn: Bill O'Hara

Management: Mick Wallace

1988 – SEOUL – Sailing in Pusan

Finn: Bill O'Hara.

Flying Dutchman: David Wilkins, Peter Kennedy

470(Women): Cathy MacAleavy, Aisling Byrne.

Reserves: Maeve McNally, Conrad Simpson.

Management: Michael Wallace, Con Murphy

1992 – BARCELONA.

Europe: Denise Lyttle

Flying Dutchman: David Wilkins, Peter Kennedy

Star: Mark Mansfield, Tom McWilliam

Reserves: Denis E O'Sullivan, Conrad Simpson

Management: Michael Wallace, Mark Lyttle, Trevor Millar

1996 – ATLANTA – Sailing in Savannah.

Laser – Mark Lyttle.

Europe – Aisling Bowman(Byrne).

Finn – John Driscoll.

Star – Mark Mansfield & David Burrows.

470 (Women) – Denise Lyttle & Louise Cole.

Soling – Marshall King, Dan O'Grady & Garrett Connolly.

Management – Derek Jago, Paddy Boyd, Anne Blaney (Physio) and Bill O'Hara.

2000 – SYDNEY

Europe – Maria Coleman.

Finn – David Burrows.

Star – Mark Mansfield & David O'Brien.

Management – Bill O'Hara, James Hynes, Garrett Connolly, Paddy Boyd, Anne Blaney (Physio)

2004 – ATHENS

Europe – Maria Coleman.

Finn – David Burrows.

Star – Mark Mansfield & Killian Collins.

49er – Tom Fitzpatrick & Fraser Brown.

470 – Gerald Owens & Ross Killian.

Laser – Rory Fitzpatrick.

Management – Garrett Connolly

2008 – QINDAO

Star – Peter O'Leary & Stephen Milne.

Finn – Tim Goodbody jnr.

Laser Radial – Ciara Peelo.

470 – Gerald Owens & Phil Lawton.

Management – James O'Callaghan.

2012 – Weymouth
 Star – Peter O'Leary & David Burrows
 49er – Ryan Seaton & Matt McGovern
 Laser Radial – Annalise Murphy
 Laser – James Espey
 470 – Gerald Owens & Scott Flanigan
 Management – James O'Callaghan

2016 – Rio
 Laser Radial Womens – Annalise Murphy - WON SILVER MEDAL
 49er – Ryan Seaton & Matt McGovern
 49erFX – Andrea Brewster & Saskia Tidey
 Laser Standard Mens – Finn Lynch
 Paralympian Sonar - John Twomey, Ian Costello & Austin O'Carroll
 Management – James O'Callaghan

2021 – Tokyo
 Laser Radial Womens – Annalise Murphy 
 49er – Robert Dickson and Sean Waddilove
 Management – James O'Callaghan

Offshore sailing
See :Category:Irish sailors (sport)

Hall of Fame 
The Association operates a hall of fame that includes:

 Clayton Love
 Helen Mary Wilkes
 Ken Ryan

Yacht Clubs
See :Category:Yacht clubs in Ireland

External links
 Irish Sailing Association

References

National members of World Sailing
Yachting associations
Sailing in Ireland
Sailing
1945 establishments in Ireland